The 2018–19 Brisbane Roar W-League season was the club's eleventh season in the W-League, the premier competition for women's football in Australia. The team played home games both at A.J. Kelly Park and Suncorp Stadium.

Players

Squad information
Last updated 1 November 2018

Transfers in

Transfer out

W-League

League table

Fixtures

Finals Series

Results summary

Results by round

References

Brisbane Roar FC (A-League Women) seasons